Flash is a village in the Staffordshire Moorlands, England, and Peak District National Park.

Location and geography
Flash is the main village in Quarnford parish. The parish forms the Staffordshire corner of Three Shire Heads, a tripoint marked by a packhorse bridge on the River Dane, where Staffordshire, Derbyshire and Cheshire meet. 

Also in this area is Ramshaw Rocks, a part of the range which includes Hen Cloud and The Roaches. The Winking Man is a rock outcrop on Ramshaw Rocks that resembles a human face in profile; its eyehole appears to 'wink' to passing travellers on the A53. 

East of Flash, and just over the A53, are the heads of the River Dove and River Manifold. Further south is the head of the River Churnet and to the north is the head of the River Goyt. The River Dane also rises within the parish.

Highest village in Britain
In 2007 the claim was upheld by the BBC, which settled a dispute with its rival claimant, Wanlockhead in Dumfries and Galloway. The Ordnance Survey measured the highest house in each village and the one in Flash was higher, although the results were disputed by residents of the Scottish village.

There is, however, no doubt that the former Methodist Chapel is the highest in Britain; the certainty is helped by the scarcity of Methodist chapels in the Southern Uplands.

The village
During the first half of the 19th century, the population of the parish was around 700; it had reduced to half that by the end of the 1800s. In 1851 there were 40 agricultural labourers, about the same number of silk workers, and almost as many colliers. There were also stonemasons, dressmakers, blacksmiths and cordwainers, and a shoemaker, errand boy, wheelwright, game-keeper, grocer, peddler and tailor, as well as a number of house servants, 275 young people and 50 scholars. At one time 29 families were receiving weekly relief and 23 families occasional relief, nearly a quarter of the population.

The first record of coalmining in the parish comes from 1401 when Thomas Smith took a year's lease on the 'vein coal' of Black Brook, near Upper Hulme. There were a large number of coal pits in the area, including Orchard Common, Blackclough, Hope, Goldsitch and Knotbury. They were worked throughout the 18th and 19th centuries, and some into the early 20th century, for both commercial and domestic use.

Flash is an isolated community with a small population; it previously had a school attended by as few as four pupils (the school is now closed). Flash previously had a reputation for being a centre for illegal activities such as cock fighting and counterfeiting ('Flash money'). According to some sources, the counterfeit money manufactured at Flash used to be exchanged at the nearby Three Shire Heads (where Staffordshire, Cheshire and Derbyshire meet, and where prizefighting was also said to have taken place. The village currently has a village shop, Flash Bar Stores, and a brewery, Flash Brewery, which produces bottled beer suitable for vegans.

St Paul's is the parish church of Quarnford, in the middle of Flash village. The church was rebuilt in 1901 to the design by Buxton architect William Radford Bryden and is a Grade II listed building.

Methodist history
Wesleyan Methodism was so well established in Flash during the 18th century that a chapel was built as early as 1784. At this time, there were 61 Methodist "members of Society". This account suggests that Flash became a centre from which Methodism spread into other neighbouring villages, such as Hollinsclough.

See also
Listed buildings in Quarnford

Notes and references

External links

 Quarnford Parish page on ONS website

Villages in Staffordshire
Towns and villages of the Peak District
Staffordshire Moorlands